Yuri Zhuravlyov may refer to:

 Yuri Zhuravlyov (footballer) (born 1996), Russian football player
 Yuri Zhuravlyov (mathematician) (born 1935), Russian mathematician